London Prepares series is the banner under which the test events for the 2012 Summer Olympic and Paralympic Games were held. The events which make up the series took place in 2011 and 2012.

Purpose
The test events focussed primarily on the testing of the field of play, results, scoring and timing systems, as well as key operational procedures and functions.

The programme was made up of three different types of events, namely:

 International invitational events, created and delivered by LOCOG (such as basketball, handball and volleyball)
 International Federation (IF) events, delivered by LOCOG in partnership with IFs and national governing bodies (for example the UKA 20 km Race Walking Championships)
 International events organised by national governing bodies and other organisations, with LOCOG testing operational aspects (for example World Badminton Championships and the London round of the triathlon world series and Wimbledon)

Ticketing
Unlike the tickets for the Olympics themselves, which were distributed via a ballot, tickets for the London Prepares events were sold on a first-come first-served basis. As part of their Olympic sponsorship, only Visa cards were accepted.

Additionally, some tickets were offered for free to local residents.

Reception

British equestrian athlete William Fox-Pitt praised Greenwich Park as the equestrian venue in July 2011: "I've been here a few times when it has been empty to get a feel for the place, and when you walk in, you just go 'wow'. It has an Olympic feel already, and this is just the test event."

However, there was criticism of the London–Surrey Cycle Classic on 14 August 2011, due to road closures causing delays for motorists in the area.

Following the IOC visit in October 2011, IOC Coordination Commission Chairman Denis Oswald said "We have once again been impressed by the overall level of planning and by the results of the first group of test events that were held this summer."

In January 2012, LOCOG stated that the gymnastics test event at the North Greenwich Arena "went well as workforce delivered the competition in a pre-existing venue and gymnastics technology including timing, scoring and results were tested and performed well. The transition of apparatus on the field of play between disciplines was also successful."

Test events

Other events
Other events which took place, but were not designated official test event status were:
2011 IFDS World Championships, which took place at the Olympic and Paralympic venue in Portland
 2009 World Artistic Gymnastics Championships which took place at the North Greenwich Arena (O2 Arena) where the event was held at the 2012 Olympics

References

External links